Trevor Henry Worthy (born 3 January 1957) is an Australia-based paleozoologist from New Zealand, known for his research on moa and other extinct vertebrates.

Biography
Worthy grew up in Broadwood, Northland, and went to Whangarei Boys' High School. He began his career as a largely self-taught palaeontologist, after becoming interested in fossils through caving. Worthy completed his BSc and MSc at the University of Waikato, then did a second Master's degree at Victoria University of Wellington.

In 1987, Worthy described three new leiopelmatid frog species from cave subfossils: the Aurora frog (Leiopelma auroraensis), Markham's frog (Leiopelma markhami), and the Waitomo frog (Leiopelma waitomoensis). In the 1990s, he discovered several fossil bird species new to science, including the long-billed wren (Dendroscansor decurvirostris) in 1991, Scarlett's shearwater (Puffinus spelaeus) in 1991, and the Niue night heron (Nycticorax kalavikai) in 1995. In 1991, he also described the Northland skink, a fossil skink species new to science.

In 1998, Worthy excavated subfossil bones in Fiji, where he found remains of the flightless Viti Levu giant pigeon (Natunaornis gigoura), the Viti Levu scrubfowl (Megapodius amissus), the Viti Levu snipe (Coenocorypha miratropica), the giant Fiji ground frog (Platymantis megabotoniviti), and the small freshwater crocodile Volia athollandersoni. The holotypes of these species were deposited in the Museum of New Zealand Te Papa Tongarewa.

For years, Worthy has been involved in the excavation of Miocene fossils (the Saint Bathans Fauna) from a prehistoric lake in Central Otago, including the oldest known moa bones, the oldest tuatara bones, and the first known fossil land mammal from New Zealand.

Worthy's research, based in Waitomo Caves, Masterton, Nelson, and Te Papa, had been funded by grants from the Foundation for Research, Science and Technology since 1991, but in 2005 his funding was cut by the Foundation. From 2005 to 2009, he was at the University of Adelaide, where he received his PhD in 2008. He received a Doctor of Science from the University of Waikato in 2011. He was at the University of New South Wales from 2009 to 2011, back at the University of Adelaide during 2012, and has been at Flinders University since 2013. In May 2019, he ended his 30-year research association with Te Papa at protest to the staff restructuring controversy.

Worthy is author or co-author of numerous research papers about prehistoric life in New Zealand. For the book The Lost World of the Moa (2002), he and Richard Holdaway received the D. L. Serventy Medal from the Royal Australasian Ornithologists Union in 2003 for an outstanding published work about Australasian avifauna.

References

External links
Personal page at Flinders University
Canterbury University – short biography
Museum of New Zealand Te Papa Tongarewa collections associated with Trevor Worthy

New Zealand paleontologists
20th-century New Zealand zoologists
Paleozoologists
Living people
1957 births
University of Adelaide alumni
21st-century New Zealand zoologists
People from the Northland Region
People educated at Whangarei Boys' High School
University of Waikato alumni
Victoria University of Wellington alumni
People associated with the Museum of New Zealand Te Papa Tongarewa